Raymond J. Tobiasz (May 10, 1916 – March 1, 1976) was a member and Sergeant at Arms of the Wisconsin State Assembly.

He was born in Milwaukee, Wisconsin and graduated from South Division High School. During World War II, Tobiasz served in the United States Army. He later became a member of AMVETS and the American Legion, as well as the Polish National Alliance and the Knights of Columbus. He died in his 60th year.

Political career
Tobiasz was elected to the Assembly in 1960 and was re-elected in 1962, 1964, 1966, 1968, 1970 and 1972. He became Sergeant at Arms in 1975. Tobiasz was a Democrat.

References

Politicians from Milwaukee
Democratic Party members of the Wisconsin State Assembly
Employees of the Wisconsin Legislature
Military personnel from Milwaukee
United States Army soldiers
United States Army personnel of World War II
1916 births
1976 deaths
20th-century American politicians
South Division High School alumni